Stanley Mayer Burstein is a historian whose writings primarily concern the Hellenistic period. He is Professor Emeritus of history at California State University, Los Angeles, and the former Chair of the Department of History. He also served as secretary-treasurer and president of the Association of Ancient Historians.

Life 
Stanley Mayer Burstein was born on September 16, 1941 in Massachusetts. He married in 1966 and had two children. He received a PhD from the University of California, Los Angeles. He wrote many textbooks which are used by Common Core including The World from 1000 BCE to 300 CE and A Brief History of Ancient Greece, International Edition: Politics, Society, and Culture.

Awards 
Burstein was awarded the California State University, Los Angeles Outstanding Professor Award (1993) and President's Distinguished Professor Award (1997) along with the 2004 Wang Family Excellence Award.

References 

21st-century American historians
21st-century American male writers
University of California, Los Angeles alumni
California State University, Los Angeles faculty
1941 births
Living people
American male non-fiction writers